Samuel Zemurray (born Schmuel Zmurri; January 18, 1877 – November 30, 1961), nicknamed "Sam the Banana Man", was an American businessman who made his fortune in the banana trade. He founded the Cuyamel Fruit Company and later became president of the United Fruit Company, the world's most influential fruit company at the time. Both companies played highly controversial roles in the history of several Latin American countries and had a significant influence on their economic and political development.

Early life
Zemurray's birth name was Schmuel Zmurri (Shmuel Davidovich Zmura). He was born to a poor Jewish family in Kishinev, Bessarabia, Russian Empire (present-day Chişinău, Moldova). His grandfather, Mendel Hirsh of Shargorod, was a Klezmer musician and bandleader. Zemurray grew up on a wheat farm. After his father died, he emigrated to America with his aunt in 1891 at age 14. After landing in New York, he settled in Selma, Alabama, where his uncle owned a general store. Zemurray worked many odd jobs during his youth, being a carpenter's assistant, delivery boy, traveling merchant, and housecleaner. Eventually, he saved enough money to bring his siblings from Europe to the United States.

Career

Career beginnings 
Zemurray encountered bananas for the first time in Selma in 1893. At the time, bananas were considered a new and exotic delicacy in the United States, and the industry was growing quickly. Zemurray went to the port of Mobile, Alabama in 1895 to enter the banana trade. Because bananas ripen quickly, the banana trade relied on the ability to quickly bring the produce to market. In Mobile, Zemurray specialized in buying cheap bananas in danger of being overripe and quickly transporting and selling them in the surrounding region by rail. Starting with only $150, he had saved $100,000 by age 21. His success earned him the nickname "Sam the Banana Man".

In 1903, Zemurray signed a contract with United Fruit, the dominant company in the banana trade. Along with his partner, Ashbell Hubbard, the newly-formed Hubbard-Zemurray Company would buy and distribute United Fruit's ripest bananas. United Fruit itself bought a portion of Hubbard-Zemurray. In 1905, Zemurray moved to New Orleans and the company acquired Thatcher Brothers Steamship Company. They also acquired the Cuyamel Fruit Company and started using that name for the company. At this time, the company imported bananas from Central American farmers, but did not grow bananas of their own.

In 1910, Zemurray bought 5,000 acres (20 km²) of land along the Cuyamel River in Honduras, near the town of Omoa. He then continued to borrow money and buy more lowland forest land in Honduras, well-suited for growing bananas. He developed this land by adding plantations, railroads, and bridges. The work was done largely by Jamaican workers, but Zemurray also liked to participate in the physical labor of the fields. At this point, Hubbard believed that Cuyamel Fruit Company's debts had grown too large, and Zemurray bought his share of the business.

Honduran coup 

Zemurray had increased the efficiency of his business through bribery and special deals with the Honduran government. But in 1910, the government of Honduras was working to reschedule their sovereign debt owed to the United Kingdom. United States Secretary of State Philander C. Knox facilitated the negotiations, which would place agents of bankers J.P. Morgan and Company in the country's customs offices to collect the taxes needed to repay the debt. Zemurray feared that the enforcement of these taxes would ruin his business, and he lobbied Knox to make the deal more favorable to him.

Knox made no concessions for Zemurray, and told him not to meddle in Honduran affairs. In spite of this instruction, Zemurray devised a plan to overthrow Honduran president Miguel Dávila in order to prevent the deal. He recruited mercenary Lee Christmas, who in turn recruited a force of about 100 other mercenaries in New Orleans, including famed Jewish soldier Sam Dreben. They sailed to Honduras in a former United States Navy vessel, where they began a war to install exiled Honduran former president Manuel Bonilla, who had been living in New Orleans. Gaining rebel soldiers from the local population, the coup was successful, and Bonilla was inaugurated on February 1, 1912. He then rewarded Zemurray with very favorable tax and land concessions for Cuyamel Fruit Company.

Sale of Cuyamel and first retirement 
In 1913, Zemurray bought back the portion of his company owned by United Fruit, a transaction that was made possible by increasing anti-trust pressure on United Fruit from the United States government. Fully in control of the company, he expanded by buying 20 ships by 1915 that were outfitted with refrigerated holds. Cuyamel Fruit began to cultivate crops beyond bananas: coconuts, pineapples, palm oil, cattle, lumber, and sugarcane.

During the 1910's and 1920's, Zemurray continuously conflicted with United Fruit. Their competition over land in Central America included pranks, sabotage, legal challenges, and approached outright violence. In 1928, a Cuyamel Fruit boat was discovered with a cache of weapons aboard. In 1929, the United States Department of State facilitated discussions between Zemurray and United Fruit to merge their companies and end the conflict, which was endangering American interests abroad. A deal was completed in 1929, in which Zemurray sold Cuyamel to United Fruit for $31.5 million in stock, making him one of the richest people in the United States. Though Zemurray had prided himself on independence, he sold his company because of increasing pressure from the Department of State and because of the financial insecurity brought on by the Great Depression in 1929.

 As part of the deal with United Fruit, Zemurray agreed to retire from the banana business entirely, to make sure he would not start a new fruit company and continue to compete with United Fruit. During this two year period, Zemurray remodeled his ornate Beaux Arts mansion in New Orleans at 2 Audubon Place. He also acquired in 1928 Houltonwood, a 25,000-acre plantation located near Hammond, Louisiana, which became a favorite retreat of Zemurray for the rest of his life. United Fruit suffered financially because of mismanagement and the Great Depression, so much so that its stock declined in value by 90% after it acquired Cuyamel.  This encouraged Zemurray to return to the banana business by buying a controlling share of United Fruit and voting out the board of directors.  Zemurray reorganized the company, decentralized decision-making and made the company profitable once more.

Leading United Fruit Company 
After the sale of Cuyamel, United Fruit's business declined because of the impact of the Great Depression. In Zemurray's view, the company could be managed better to handle the economic downturn. Though he sent a letter and attended a board meeting, United Fruit's management was not interested in his ideas. Zemurray then visited individual United Fruit shareholders and collected their proxies, which would enable him to gain control of the company. He then attended a United Fruit board meeting, in which he produced the proxies, dramatically saying, "You've been fucking up this business long enough. I'm going to straighten it out."

Now as president of United Fruit Company, Zemurray succeeded in improving business. He considered his hands-on approach of visiting banana plantations to be the key to his success. He gained a detailed understanding of operations, resulting in mass terminations of weak employees, improved efficiency in the use of ships, and new financial approaches.

Partially as a result of banana diseases Sigatoka and Panama disease, Zemurray presided over very large acquisitions of land in Central America. Because the diseases were not curable, United Fruit would simply move to a new area of land after previous ones became infected. In this way, United Fruit came to own the majority of private land in countries like Honduras, even though much of it was left uncultivated.

Guatemalan coup 
In 1953, the U.S. State Department and United Fruit embarked on a major public relations campaign to convince the American people and the rest of the U.S. government that Colonel Jacobo Arbenz intended to make Guatemala a Soviet "satellite".  Zemurray authorized Edward Bernays to launch a propaganda campaign against Col. Arbenz's democratically elected government, which intended to expropriate some of the unused land owned by the United Fruit Co. and redistribute it to the local peasants. In 1954, the campaign succeeded and the U.S. Central Intelligence Agency helped orchestrate a coup that replaced Arbenz with a military junta led by Col. Carlos Castillo Armas.

Zemurray retired as president of United Fruit in late 1951.  He and his family made generous donations to Tulane University (including a large collection of Mayan artifacts discovered in banana fields), the Zamorano Pan-American Agricultural School, and to other philanthropic ventures, including the Zionist movement through his personal acquaintance, beginning in the 1920s, with Chaim Weizmann.  Zemurray supported President Franklin D. Roosevelt's New Deal policies, helping to draft the Agricultural Adjustment Administration industry codes, and contributed financially to left-wing causes, such as The Nation magazine.

Innovations 
Zemurray and his company developed several innovations in banana farming, which contributed toward Cuyamel Fruit Company's increased efficiency over United Fruit.

 Selective pruning: removing the smallest and weakest banana plants.
 Drainage: adding spillways and canals to drain excess water away from plants.
 Silting: some fields were allowed to be flooded, which helped fertilize them with silt.
 Staking: banana plants were attached to a bamboo shoot, helping prevent them from blowing over in the wind.
 Overhead irrigation: sprinklers were added to banana fields so that plants received water year-round.

Personal life 
Zemurray married Sarah Weinberger in May 1908. Weinberger was the daughter of Jake Weinberger, an early figure in the banana trade and employee of Zemurray's. Weinberger published a cookbook titled One Hundred Unusual Dinners and How to Prepare Them. Their daughter, archaeologist Doris Zemurray Stone, was born in 1909. Their son, Samuel Jr., was born in 1913. He went missing in action as a pilot in World War II, leaving a widow and two children.

Once he had earned substantial amounts of money, Zemurray was actively philanthropic. In the United States, he gave thousands of dollars to Tulane University, Radcliffe College, The Nation magazine, and to clinics and hospitals in New Orleans. In Central America, he funded hospitals, roads, infrastructure, and schools, including the Zamorano Pan-American Agricultural School.

Zemurray was a member of Temple Sinai in New Orleans.

See also

 James Dole, pineapple businessman

References

Bibliography
Peter Chapman.  Bananas: How the United Fruit Company Shaped the World.  New York, NY: Canongate, 2008.
The Associated Press. "Samuel Zemurray, 84, Is Dead; Headed United Fruit Company". The New York Times, December 2, 1961.
Thomas P. McCann. On the Inside. Beverly, Massachusetts: Quinlan Press, 1987.
Chaim Weizmann (1949). Trial and Error: The Autobiography of Chaim Weizmann. Jewish Publication Society of America.
Maggie Heyn Richardson, "Banana Man", Imagine Louisiana magazine, Summer 2007.
Stephen Kinzer. Overthrow.  New York, NY: Times Books, 2006.
Rich Cohen. The Fish That Ate the Whale. New York, NY: Farrar Straus Giroux, 2012.
Dan Koeppel. Banana: The Fate of the Fruit That Changed the World, Hudson Street Press.

External links
 "America's Gone Bananas: Here's How It Happened", by NPR Staff, June 2, 2012

American food industry businesspeople
American philanthropists
People of the Banana Wars
Bessarabian Jews
Businesspeople from New Orleans
1877 births
1961 deaths
Emigrants from the Russian Empire to the United States
United Fruit Company
Jews and Judaism in Louisiana
People from Chișinău